Saint Laura of Constantinople (died 1453) was a Christian who lived in Constantinople during the 15th century. She was born in Greece into a noble family: her father was a Latin knight named Michael and her mother was Albanian. Her name was Theodolinde Trasci. After she became a nun in Constantinople, she changed it into Laura, eventually rising to become an abbess. She was martyred by the Ottoman Turks who took Constantinople on 29 May 1453. They scalded her to death with the other 52 sisters of her convent. 
Her feast day is on May 29.

Notes

1400 births
1453 deaths
15th-century Christian martyrs
15th-century Christian saints
Byzantine female saints
Christian saints killed by Muslims
15th-century Byzantine nuns
Assassinated Byzantine people
15th-century Albanian people
Saints from Constantinople
Trinitarian saints
Female murder victims
Byzantine saints